The 4th Annual Indie Soap Awards (ISA4) took place on February 19, 2013, once again at New World Stages in New York. The nonprofit Indie Series Network served as the charity sponsor. Colleen Zenk and Kevin Spirtas, who both landed on web series after attending ISA3, opened the show. Two former ISA winners, Martha Byrne and Hillary B. Smith, closed the show as the theater once again was filled with bubbles. The ceremony was live-streamed for the first time ever.

Awards 
Winners are listed first and highlighted in boldface:

References

External links
 Indie Series Awards History and Archive of Past Winners

Indie Series Awards
2013 film awards